Amieva is a municipality in the autonomous community of Asturias, Spain. It is also the name of one of the municipality's subdivisions (parroquias, or parish).

Amieva municipality is sparsely inhabited, having a resident population of 868 (2005) and a population density of fewer than 8 people per square kilometre. The total area covers some 114 km2.

History

Coat of Arms

Old arms 
 Top: Emblem of Pelayo
 Bottom: Two emblems of important families  of the City

New arms 
Since 30 August 2001.
Top left > Represents agriculture
Top right > Represents the Forest economy
Bottom > Represents the Rio Sella and the Picos de Europa, the most important natural features.

Politics

Parishes
Amieva is divided into 5 parishes:
Amieva
Argolibio 
Mian 
San Román 
Sebarga

Demography

References 

Population data INE
Postal codes 
Altitdude Google Earth

External links
Amieva Digital
Council of Amieva
Amieva y Alto Sella
Rural village in Amieva; rental rooms
Amieva Full Rental House

Municipalities in Asturias

Articles which contain graphical timelines